Neon Bible is the second studio album by Canadian indie rock band Arcade Fire. It was first released on March 5, 2007, in Europe and a day later in North America by Merge Records. Originally announced on December 16, 2006, through the band's website, the majority of the album was recorded at a church the band bought and renovated in Farnham, Quebec. The album is the first to feature drummer Jeremy Gara, and the first to include violinist Sarah Neufeld among the band's core line-up.

Neon Bible became Arcade Fire's highest-charting album at the time, debuting on the Billboard 200 at number two, selling 92,000 copies in its first week and more than 400,000 to date. Being released within a month of similarly successful releases by  The Shins (Wincing the Night Away) and Modest Mouse (We Were Dead Before the Ship Even Sank), Neon Bible was cited as an example of the popularization of indie rock. Critics met the self-produced Neon Bible with acclaim. Publications like NME and IGN praised the album for its grandiose nature, while Rolling Stone and Uncut opined that it resulted in a distant and overblown sound.

Production
Following the release of Funeral (2004), which had been recorded in an attic studio known as Hotel2Tango, Arcade Fire decided a permanent recording location was necessary. Following their tour in support of Funeral, the band bought the Petite Église in Farnham, Quebec. Being used as a café at the time of purchase, the Petite Église had once been a church and a Masonic Temple. Once renovation of the church was complete, the band spent the latter half of 2006 recording a majority of the album there. Michael Pärt produced additional recordings in Budapest, recording the Budapest Film Orchestra and a military men's choir. Other sessions included one in New York, where the band recorded along the Hudson River to be near water.

Having produced most of the album themselves, the band decided to bring in someone else for the mixing. Tracks were sent to several well-known mixers/producers to experiment with and after deciding they liked Nick Launay's ideas best, the band invited him to their studio to work on the songs further. For a month Launay worked with the album's engineer and co-producer Marcus Strauss on the mixing of each song, with the band regularly driving up from Montreal to assess their progress. In an interview with HitQuarters, Launay described the mixing process as a "playful thing".

Composition
Beginning work on Neon Bible immediately following a North American tour in support of the band's first album, Funeral, songwriter Win Butler, born in the United States but having lived in Canada for several years, said that he felt he was observing his homeland from an outsider's point of view. The album is rooted in Americana themes, with Bob Dylan, Bruce Springsteen and Elvis Presley being cited as influences.

Arcade Fire began recording with what would become "Black Mirror" and a reworking of the Arcade Fire EP song "No Cars Go" as their starting point. Once the title of the album was decided upon, the band was further inspired after they, according to Win Butler, "watched a lot of TV preachers, get-rich-quick schemes on YouTube." The band was also attracted to using the ocean and television as central images for the album, with Win Butler saying the ocean imagery symbolizes a lack of control; of television, Butler stated that:

These ideas are reflected in the arrangement and composition of the album, which lead to a sound of dread and dissonance. The band used a number of less common instruments to achieve this sound; in addition to the orchestra and choir, Neon Bible features a hurdy-gurdy, mandolin, accordion and pipe organ. Win Butler has said that in conceiving the album he hoped for a more stripped-down sound but the songs demanded further instrumentation.

The song "(Antichrist Television Blues)" was originally titled "Joe Simpson (Antichrist Television Blues)" in reference to the father and manager of singers Jessica and Ashlee Simpson. Butler chose to remove Simpson's name from the title, keeping the subtitle parentheses intact. Butler would introduce "(Antichrist Television Blues)" during live performances as "a song about what happens when fathers grow up to manage their daughters."

Artwork
The artwork for the album is a photograph of a six-foot neon sign that the band commissioned for use while on tour. In the photograph used for the cover, the lighted Bible is caught in mid-flicker. Rolling Stone named the artwork one of the five best of the year. AOL Music cited the cover as an example of an artist "keeping artwork alive." The artwork would go on to win Tracy Maurice and François Miron the Juno Award for best CD/DVD Artwork Design of the Year. Frontman Win Butler stated in an interview that the album title is derived from him being particularly attracted to the image, not from the John Kennedy Toole novel The Neon Bible.

Promotion
Largely due to band member Régine Chassagne's Haitian ancestry, the band has tried to raise support and awareness for the socio-economic problems in Haiti throughout their career. The Haitian people had 15,000 dollars donated to them on November 5, 2005. On December 26, 2006, they supported Haitian charity organization Partners In Health by releasing the song "Intervention" on iTunes and donating the proceeds. However, they accidentally uploaded "Black Wave/Bad Vibrations", the track after "Intervention" on Neon Bible. While the song was quickly removed once the problem was discovered, file sharers quickly circulated it on various P2P networks. On his blog, Win Butler quipped, "I guess it is sort of charming that we can send the wrong song to the whole world with a click of a mouse... Oh well."

On December 28, 2006, the band allowed listeners to listen to their first single, "Black Mirror", by calling the number (866) NEON-BIBLE, extension number 7777. The song was also streamed on the band's website beginning on January 6, 2007. The following day, the band revealed a variety of information about the album through a YouTube video. The video, which played a number of sound clips from the upcoming album and featured "Juno award-winning guitarist Richard Reed Parry", gave the album's track listing, release date, and record label.

On February 2, 2007, all the lyrics to Neon Bible were released on the band's website. Also included was the text and an audio clip of a child reading "The Wolf and the Fox", a French fable allegedly written by 17th century French poet Jean de La Fontaine, an allusion to "The Well and the Lighthouse", which is loosely based around the fable. This was followed on February 5, 2007, with the band releasing a promotional pamphlet as a JPEG image on their website that included album-related imagery and much of the French and English text from "The Wolf and the Fox".

In October 2007, Arcade Fire created a website at beonlineb.com with the date October 6 displayed on it. After speculation over what the website was about, including rumors of new material or a live streaming of a concert, it was eventually revealed to be a video for "Neon Bible", featuring Win Butler's face and hands, which the viewer can interact with during the song. ("Beonlineb" is an anagram of "Neon Bible.") "Neon Bible" was the first song on the album to have a music video.

Tour
Arcade Fire began their tour in support of the album in January and February 2007, playing a series of concerts at churches and other small venues in Ottawa, Montreal, London and New York. This was followed by a 23 date European tour in March and early April, though the last 9 dates of this were cancelled due to illness. The first North American leg of the tour began April 26 in San Diego and April 28 at Coachella Valley Music and Arts Festival and contained 26 dates. This leg contained openings by The National, St. Vincent, and Electrelane. The band then began an 11-date European leg at Glastonbury Festival on June 22 before returning to North America for 10 more LCD Soundsystem-supported dates beginning September 15 at Austin City Limits. The Neon Bible tour continued with 14 more dates in Europe between October 25 and November 19, and six dates beginning January 18, 2008 in Australia and New Zealand as part of the Big Day Out festival. The tour then ended after three more shows from February 7 in Japan.

Reception

Compared to the band's debut, Funeral, Neon Bible experienced breakthrough commercial success. During its first week, it debuted at number one in both Canada and Ireland, and number two in the United States, the United Kingdom and Portugal. Neon Bible was out-charted only by Notorious B.I.G.'s greatest hits compilation in the U.S. and the Kaiser Chiefs's Yours Truly, Angry Mob in the UK. It was certified gold by the CRIA in Canada in March 2007.

Upon release, Neon Bible garnered universal acclaim, receiving an 87—the seventh highest score of 2007—from review aggregator Metacritic. NME reviewer Mark Beaumont commented the album "is a climactic monolith of a record in the grand tradition of melodic transatlantic clamour rock." The A.V. Club reviewer Kyle Ryan interpreted the album as a commentary on the post-9/11 American world, saying that "the band is seemingly sending a beacon to other reasonable people forced underground by the world's insanity." Stylus contributor Derek Miller saw the album in similar terms, saying that while the album touches on "violence, paranoia, the falsity of simple labor, the war-call of organized religion—a what's what of indie turmoil after 2003" the band go further to the point where its "thematic threads bind the songs." Robert Christgau gave the album a "A+" grade, saying that Butler and co. "thud rather than thunder. But what a loud and joyous thud it is."

IGN, in giving the album 8.9 out of 10, said "the playing overall seems tighter and more cohesive" and that the album is a "grandiose project, one teeming with jubilant enthusiasm and reverent abundance." Other publications agreed, but viewed some of these same elements negatively. Rolling Stone reviewer David Fricke wrote that he was surprised such a large band could "sound so distant here so often," saying that "the result is a huge sound that only sparkles on the edges, leaving Butler alone in the middle." However, Rolling Stone also named it the fourth best album of the year. Uncuts three-star review of the album said that "at its overblown worst Neon Bible is one of those records that takes itself too seriously to be taken seriously."

Neon Bible was a finalist for the 2007 Polaris Music Prize. Neon Bible was nominated for Best Alternative Album for the 50th Annual Grammy Awards. It was #4 in NME albums of the year, fourth in Rolling Stone'''s list of albums of the year and album of the year in Q in December 2007. The album won the 2008 Juno Award for Alternative Album of the Year.

Accolades

EditionsNeon Bible was released in three versions. They included:
 A traditional compact disc in a jewel case.
 A deluxe compact disc packaged in a paperboard clamshell box with a lenticular front cover and accompanied by two 32-page flip books designed by Tracy Maurice using material shot in 16mm film by filmmaker Francois Miron.
 A double LP that featured the album on three sides of the vinyl at 180-gram quality and an etching on the fourth side. This release also came with a code to allow purchasers to download the entire album in MP3 format. Due to manufacturing delays, this release came out more than two months after the previous versions, on May 8, 2007.

In popular culture
 "My Body is a Cage" was featured in a TV spot for the 2008 film The Curious Case of Benjamin Button.
 "My Body is a Cage" was featured in the season one finale of HBO's Euphoria.
 Peter Gabriel's cover of "My Body is a Cage" was featured in the House episode "Out of the Chute", was part of the soundtrack for the video game Assassin's Creed III, appeared in the trailers for John Carter and Helstrom and plays a major role in the key scene of the TV-series Dark in its season two episode eight finale "Endings and Beginnings".
 Peter Gabriel's cover of "My Body is a Cage" was featured in the Lucifer series finale "Partners 'Til the End."
 Peter Gabriel's cover of "My Body is a Cage" was also featured in the Season 1 finale of Hulu's Dietland, an adaptation of the novel of the same name by Sarai Walker.
A ballad arrangement of "My Body is a Cage" for brass and percussion featured prominently in Santa Clara Vanguard's 2018 DCI Championship winning show, Babylon.
 "Intervention" is featured as the opening theme for the satirical YouTube livestream programs Jesus Chatline and Buddhism Hotline.
 The title of the dystopian television series Black Mirror is partly inspired by Neon Bibles opening track of the same name. The term "black mirror" refers to the dark reflection of a viewer rendered by a dormant television or smartphone screen.

A Giant Dog's cover
In 2019, Merge Records (Arcade Fire's label for their earlier records, including Neon Bible), released a full-album cover version of Neon Bible'' by American rock band A Giant Dog. Vocalist Sabrina Ellis commented that "the themes in the album, of outrage at U.S. leadership in the early 2000s, and a need to escape our social climate, sadly, remain pertinent today."

Track listing

Personnel
Personnel adapted from album liner notes.

Arcade Fire (mixing, production, arrangement):
Will Butler
Win Butler
Régine Chassagne
Jeremy Gara
Tim Kingsbury
Sarah Neufeld
Richard Reed Parry

Other personnel:
Mélanie Auclair – Cello
Hadji Bakara – Effects
Owen Pallett – Violin, orchestral arrangements (tracks 1, 2, 10) with Régine Chassagne
Liza Rey – Harp
Marika Anthony Shaw – Viola
 Brass: Pietro Amato, Edith Gruber, Margaret Gundara, Jake Henry, Laurent Ménard, Geoffrey Shoesmith, Colin Stetson, Andreas Stoltzfus, Jacob Valenzuela, Martin Wenk
 Vocals: Shauna Callender, Joanne Degand, Chantel Gero, Tasha Gero, Jean Sherwood
Peter F. Drucker – Choir conductor
István Silló – Orchestra conductor

Technical personnel
Frank Arkwright – Mastering
Scott Colburn – Engineer
Markus Dravs – Engineer, mixing (tracks 3, 5)
Nick Launay – Mixing (tracks 2, 4, 6–9, 11)
Jean Luc Della Montagna – Production assistant
Mark "Spike" Stent – Mixing (tracks 1, 10)
Other assistants: François Chevallier, Alex Dromgoole, Dave Emery, Doctor Brian A. Evans, Mike Feuerstack, Tommy Hough, James Hanna Ogilvy
Christophe Collette – Photography
Katherine Cram – Coordination
Daryl Griffith – Copyist
Olivier Groulx – Animation, editing
Csaba Lokös – Orchestra contractor
Tracy Maurice – Director, artwork, package design
François Miron – Photography director
Renata Morales – Costume design
Vincent Morisset – Web design
Michael Paert – Coordination, editing

Charts

Weekly charts

Year-end charts

Certifications

References

2007 albums
Arcade Fire albums
Concept albums
Merge Records albums
Juno Award for Alternative Album of the Year albums